Conasprella henriquei is a species of sea snail, a marine gastropod mollusc in the family Conidae, the cone snails and their allies.

Like all species within the genus Conasprella, these snails are predatory and venomous. They are capable of "stinging" humans, therefore live ones should be handled carefully or not at all.

Description

Distribution
This species occurs in the Caribbean Sea.

References

 Petuch E.J. & Myers R.F. (2014) New species of Conidae and Conilithidae (Gastropoda: Conoidea) from the Bahamas, eastern Caribbean, and Brazil. Xenophora Taxonomy 3: 26–46.
  Puillandre N., Duda T.F., Meyer C., Olivera B.M. & Bouchet P. (2015). One, four or 100 genera? A new classification of the cone snails. Journal of Molluscan Studies. 81: 1–23

External links
 

henriquei
Gastropods described in 2014